"Big Bang Baby" is a song featured on Tiny Music... Songs from the Vatican Gift Shop, the third album by the band Stone Temple Pilots. It was the first single to be released from the album, which appeared on several Billboard record charts: No. 28 on the Hot 100 Airplay, No. 1 on the Mainstream Rock Tracks and No. 2 on the Modern Rock Tracks charts.

"Big Bang Baby" also appears on the greatest hits album Thank You.

Background

Referencing the Tiny Music... album in his memoir, Scott Weiland said: "We wanted to make a statement. We wanted to deconstruct, go low-tech, get to the dark heart of the matter. I was happy to write Bowie-esque stream-of-consciousness lyrics that didn't need to make sense. Example: 'Big Bang Baby.'"

Music video

The music video features the band performing in a white room. It was an intentional pastiche of videos from the early days of MTV, which were mostly shot on videotape rather than film, and most directly evokes the look of The J. Geils Band's "Freeze Frame".

Charts

References

1996 singles
Stone Temple Pilots songs
Songs written by Scott Weiland
Songs written by Robert DeLeo
Song recordings produced by Brendan O'Brien (record producer)
1996 songs
Atlantic Records singles
Glam rock songs